Zavin Rural District is a rural district (dehestan) in Zavin District, Kalat County, Razavi Khorasan Province, Iran. At the 2006 census, its population was 8,932, in 2,045 families.  The rural district has 12 villages.

References 

Rural Districts of Razavi Khorasan Province
Kalat County